The Hungover Games is a 2014 American parody film, directed by Josh Stolberg. The film's title and central plot primarily follow both The Hangover and The Hunger Games, as well as parodying Ted, Pirates of the Caribbean, Avatar, Charlie and the Chocolate Factory, The Human Centipede, The Lone Ranger, Django Unchained, Thor, Carrie, The Muppets, Borat, The Walking Dead, District 9, and The Real Housewives.

Plot
Four friends head out for a bachelor party for their friend Doug, who is marrying a man named Tracey. They plan a quiet, subdued night at a small hotel in Laughlin, Nevada. They put their friend Zach in a straitjacket and cone to ensure he does not drug them and they drink non-alcoholic beer.

Waking up the next morning, they are in a strange room littered with party and sex toys and realize that Doug is missing. A woman named "Effing" walks in and Zach recognizes her as a remake of Effie Trinket. When Ed opens the door they find they are on a train bound for the "Hungover Games," a fight to the death in an arena between various Hollywood districts. The three watch a video on Zach's phone and see that they all volunteered as tribute the previous night in their drunken state. They will have to fight in the games to find Doug and get him back to his wedding in time.

At the training center they meet other tributes, including the gay Thor, Tonto, Gratuitous Nudity (two topless women), Carrie (nicknamed Scary), and Ted. Ed meets Katnip Everlean, a girl he met the previous night while drunk who likes him. Training ends and they are sent to rooms where they will ascend into the arena. While searching the rooms they see a man rising but are forced out after Zach spills boba tea on the control panel.

The games begin and the tributes begin murdering each other. Zach becomes separated from Ed and Bradley. The two flee and spend the night in a tree to sleep but witness two other tributes' deaths. They see Zach with the Careers and see he has joined them to help find (and kill) Ed and Bradley. In the morning Bradley drops a hive of "Swaggerjacks" (wasps) onto the careers sleeping below them. In the process Bradley and Ed are stung several times and the hallucinogenic venom causes them to pass out. They awaken and find Zach has nursed them back to health and they continue searching for Doug.

Zach tells them they are in the Hungover Games because the previous night "midnight berry" scented air-fresheners he plugged in poisoned and drugged them. The air-fresheners "may cause transportation to futuristic dystopia." Enraged, Ed and Bradley leave Zach.

Later, Ed and Bradley decide to reunite with Zach after the rule change stating that people who share a "bromance" can win as a group.

The three head back to the Pornucopia after an announcement that something everyone is looking for is located there. They rush to the Pornucopia and are attacked by Carrie. Zach murders Carrie, then Ted and the two puppets attack them but Zach blows them up using his Hunger Games's book and Katnip returns and saves Ed from Ted. She reveals she was mortally wounded in her fight with Tonto and dies with Ed beside her.

When they find out that their prize at the Pornucopia is a cell phone, and not Doug, they think they will never find him and start to call Tracey tell him what's up. However, Ed realizes where Doug is and stops Bradley from making the call. Doug's tube never came up because Zach's bubble tea short-circuited his tube. After looking into it they see that Doug isn't there, but he emerges from the forest, camouflaged, and attacks them, berating them about how they always forget him and how he is almost never in the movies. They tell him they will never forget him again and that he will have more lines in the next film, and he decides to spare them.

Another rule change states that there can only be one victor and the four turn on each other. Zach proposes they all eat poisonous berries, as the creators of the games would never let them all die as they would rather have four victors than none, and would stop them before they can eat the poison. His plan fails, as they eat the berries and die with no one stopping them.

They wake up in their hotel room, realizing it was just a shared dream. The four go to the wedding where Ed laments about Katnip but runs into an identical looking girl who seems to be attracted to him.

Cast

 Ben Begley as Ed
 Ross Nathan as Bradley
 Herbert Russell as Zach
 Rita Volk as Katnip Everlean
 John Livingston as Doug
 Robert Wagner as Liam
 Caitlyn Jenner as Skip Bayflick
 Hank Baskett as Stephen A. Templesmith
 Brandi Glanville as Housewife Veronica
 Camille Grammer as Housewife Tanya
 Kyle Richards as Housewife Heather
 Dat Phan as Bao
 Sam Pancake as Tracey
 Ron Butler as President Snowbama
 Tara Reid as Effing White
 Chanel Gaines as Boo
 Kayden Kross as Chastity the Topless Blonde
 Sophie Dee as Kirsty the Topless Brunette
 Jonathan Silverman as Chineca Lame
 Jamie Kennedy as Justmitch / Willy Wanker / Tim Pistol
 Steve Sobel as Kaptain Kazakhstan 
 Caitlin Wachs as Scary
 Terra Jolé as Teddy
 Little Foot as Gay Thor

Reception

Brian Orndorf writing for Blu-ray.com gives the film 3/10 stars.

See also
 The Starving Games
 The Hunger Pains

References

External links
 
 

2014 films
American parody films
2010s parody films
Films directed by Josh Stolberg
2010s English-language films
2010s American films